This article shows the rosters of all participating teams at the netball tournament at the 2018 Commonwealth Games on the Gold Coast, Australia.

Pool A

Australia

Barbados

Fiji

Jamaica

Northern Ireland

South Africa

Pool B

England

Malawi

New Zealand

Scotland

Uganda

Wales

References

External links 
  - Gold Coast 2018 Commonwealth Games Basketball Coverage

 
Commonwealth